The 2003 Nordic Figure Skating Championships were held from February 6th through 9th, 2003 in Reykjavík, Iceland. The competition was open to elite figure skaters from Nordic countries. Skaters competed in two disciplines, men's singles and ladies' singles, across two levels: senior (Olympic-level) and junior.

Senior results

Men

Ladies

Junior results

Men

Ladies

References

Nordic Figure Skating Championships, 2003
Nordic Figure Skating Championships, 2003
Nordic Figure Skating Championships
International figure skating competitions hosted by Iceland
Figure skating in Iceland
Sports competitions in Reykjavík